French oak may refer to:
Quercus robur, a species of tree
 the wood used in making wine casks, see Oak (wine)